The 2005 North African Futsal Cup is the 1st Championship and it took place in Tripoli, Libya from September 19 - September 26, 2005.

Group stage

Matches

Honors

See also
Futsal Planet
RSSF

International futsal competitions hosted by Libya
North African Futsal Cup, 2005
North African Futsal Cup
2005–06 in Libyan football
Sport in Tripoli, Libya
2005–06 in Moroccan football
2005–06 in Tunisian football